Penniless Hearts (also known as Love, Money and Philosophy and Broke Hearts) is a 1996 Italian romantic comedy film written and directed by Giuseppe Piccioni.

Cast 

Margherita Buy: Lucia
Giulio Scarpati: Stefano
Gene Gnocchi: Giulio
Gaia De Laurentis: Martina
Antonio Catania: Piero
Delphine Telesio: Rebecca
Piero Natoli: Marcello
Paolo Maria Scalondro: Direttore banca
Katarina Vasilissa: Caterina

References

External links

1996 romantic comedy films
1996 films
Italian romantic comedy films
Films directed by Giuseppe Piccioni
1990s Italian films